The 3rd Ohio Infantry Regiment (or 3rd OVI) was an infantry regiment in the Union Army during the American Civil War. It served in several important campaigns in the Western Theater in Kentucky, Tennessee, and Alabama.

Three-months regiment
With the outbreak of the Civil War, President Abraham Lincoln called for 75,000 volunteers to help put down the rebellion. Ohioans responded well, and several new regiments were enrolled for a term of three months, thought to be long enough to end the war. The 3rd Ohio Infantry Regiment was organized at Camp Jackson in Columbus on April 25, 1861, under Colonel Isaac Morrow, Lieutenant Colonel John Beatty, and Major J. Warren Keifer. The regiment moved to newly constructed Camp Dennison near Cincinnati on April 28, and served on garrison duty there until June 12, at which time many of the men joined the newly reorganized three-years regiment with the same numerical designation. Those three months men who elected not to join the three-years regiment were mustered out on July 24.

Three-years regiment

Early service
The three-years 3rd Ohio Infantry Regiment was organized at Camp Dennison on June 12, 1861. After a few days of training and drilling, it moved to Grafton, Virginia (now West Virginia) and then on to Clarksburg on June 20–25, where it was attached to the 1st Brigade, Army of Occupation, West Virginia, until September. The regiment saw action in the West Virginia Campaign, capturing the Confederate-held town of Beverly on July 12. They remained on duty in western Virginia through the balance of the year, fighting in several small skirmishes and battles, including the battles of Rich Mountain and Cheat Mountain.

In October, the 3rd Ohio Infantry was shipped to Louisville, Kentucky, and served for the rest of the war in the Western Theater. After wintering near Elizabethtown, Kentucky, the regiment, then in the army of Ormsby Mitchel, was part of the general advance on Confederate-held Nashville, Tennessee, in February 1862. After occupying the city, the 9th moved toward Murfreesboro, Tennessee and assisted in capturing the city of Huntsville, Alabama, on April 11. The 3rd Ohio remained in Alabama until late August when it was part of the Union forces that pursued Braxton Bragg's Confederate army during the Kentucky Campaign.

On October 8, 1862, the 3rd Ohio Infantry was heavily involved at the Battle of Perryville. Two weeks later, it marched back to Murfreesboro and remained there through the winter, participating in the Battle of Stones River at year's end. 

In April 1863, the regiment was part of Streight's Raid to Rome, Georgia from April 26 until May 3. It was involved in fights at Day's Gap, Sand Mountain, and Crooked Creek and Hog Mountain. Much of the regiment was captured on May 3 near Rome and taken as prisoners of war. The officers and men were sent to Belle Isle and Libby Prison. The captives were exchanged later that month and sent northward to Camp Chase in Columbus, Ohio, to reorganize.

In June, the regiment helped quell the Holmes County Rebellion, and a month later was involved in the pursuit of Morgan's Raiders. On August 1, the regiment was transported to Nashville and then on to Bridgeport, Alabama, where it was on guard duty until October. Then, it was part of the Union expedition against Confederates under Nathan Bedford Forrest. On November 27, the regiment was sent to the rear lines to perform garrison duty at Chattanooga, Tennessee, until June 1864. It was then ordered back to Camp Dennison on June 9, where it mustered out June 23, 1864.

During its term of service, the 3rd Ohio Infantry lost 4 officers and 87 enlisted men killed and mortally wounded, and 3 officers and 78 enlisted men by disease, for a total of 172 fatalities.

See also
Ohio in the Civil War
148th Infantry Regiment (United States)

Notes

References

 Baumgartner, Richard A., Buckeye Blood: Ohio at Gettysburg. Huntington, West Virginia: Blue Acorn Press, 2003. .

Further reading
 Ohio Roster Commission. Official Roster of the Soldiers of the State of Ohio in the War on the Rebellion, 1861–1865, compiles under the direction of the Roster commission. 12 vol. Akron: Werner Co., 1886–95.

External links
 Ohio in the Civil War: 3rd OVI by Larry Stevens
 Ohio Historical Society: Battleflags and Relics
 National Park Service: Civil War Soldiers and Sailors System
 
Civil War Index: 3rd Ohio Infantry - 3 Months Service in the American Civil War
Civil War Index: 3rd Ohio Infantry - 3 Years Service in the American Civil War

Units and formations of the Union Army from Ohio
The Lightning Mule Brigade
Military units and formations established in 1861
Military units and formations disestablished in 1864
1864 disestablishments in Ohio